Sara T. Brand is an American business executive. She is the founder of True Wealth Ventures and co-founder of (512) Brewing Company.

Biography
Brand grew up in both Wisconsin and Arizona.

Brand obtained a bachelor's degree in mechanical engineering from the University of Texas at Austin in 1996.

She enrolled at the University of California at Berkeley in 1996 and graduated in 1998 with a master's degree in mechanical engineering and a management of technology certification from Berkeley's Haas School of Business, and then a doctorate degree in mechanical engineering in 2000.

Before her career in venture capital, Brand worked as a semiconductor researcher in several companies including Intel and Applied Materials, and she served as a strategic management consultant at McKinsey & Company. She also worked at Fremont Ventures in San Francisco for a few years before joining AMD, where she stayed over a decade until 2015, leading AMD's acquisition integration of ATI Technologies in 2006 and reporting directly to three of the company's four CEOs during her tenure.

In 2008, she and her husband, Kevin Brand, co-founded (512) Brewing Company. 

She started True Wealth Ventures, a female-focused venture capital firm, in 2015, where she also serves as the Founding General Partner. The firm's investment focus is explicitly on women-led companies improving human and environmental health. In January 2018, when they closed their first fund, around 80 percent of their investors were women.

In June 2022, they announced the closing of their oversubscribed $35M Fund II, again backed by 80 percent women LPs.

References

Living people
American women business executives
University of Texas at Austin alumni
Year of birth missing (living people)
University of California, Berkeley alumni